Oriana Bedingfield (born 6 July 1984) is a Maltese footballer who plays as a midfielder for First Division club Mosta FC. She has been a member of the Malta women's national team.

See also
List of Malta women's international footballers

References

1984 births
Living people
Women's association football midfielders
Maltese women's footballers
Malta women's international footballers
Mosta F.C. players